Azurmendi is a Basque surname. Notable people with the surname include:

 Clara Azurmendi (born 1998), Spanish badminton player
 Eneko Azurmendi (born 1977), Basque chef
 Joxe Azurmendi (born 1941), Basque writer, philosopher, essayist, and poet
 Mikel Azurmendi (1942–2021), Spanish anthropologist
 Nora Azurmendi (born 1995), Spanish handballer

Basque-language surnames